Barbara Jean Ostfeld, formerly known as Barbara Ostfeld-Horowitz, is the first ordained female cantor in Jewish history, and an American feminist, mental health advocate, and author.

Early life and education 

Barbara Jean Ostfeld was born in 1952 in St. Louis, Missouri and grew up in Elmhurst, Illinois.

Her mother, Ruth Vogel Ostfeld, was an occupational therapist, a cellist, a vice president of the League of Women Voters of Connecticut and president of Congregation Mishkan Israel (1994-1996).

Her father, Adrian M. Ostfeld, was the Anna M. R. Lauder Professor of Public Health at Yale University, and was internationally known for his research on the epidemiology of coronary heart disease, stroke, and aging.

All of her grandparents immigrated to the United States between 1903 and 1925. Her maternal grandparents were born in Austria-Hungary and eventually bought a dry goods store in South Bend, Indiana. Her paternal grandparents were both from Bucharest, Romania. Her father's mother was a chemist and her father's father a dentist. They settled in St. Louis, Missouri.

Beginning when she was very young, Ostfeld loved to sing. Nicknamed “Barbi,” she loved to sing all the music she heard, including American standards from the radio, classic songs from Disney movies, and blessings she learned at Friday evening services at her synagogue. Throughout her early childhood, it was her synagogue—Oak Park Temple, a Reform congregation—where Ostfeld felt the most secure and happy.

Ostfeld decided to become a cantor at age 8, because participating in prayer made her feel like she was part of something important, and because her congregation's emphasis on civil rights was significant to her family.

She began studying piano as a young child and began taking voice lessons at age 11. Her voice teacher encouraged her to audition for the children's chorus of Chicago's Lyric Opera, and although she won the audition, her father did not allow her to participate.

Later, in addition to listening to The Beatles and The Rolling Stones like her peers, Ostfeld was also listening to vinyl recordings of music performed in the court of Queen Elizabeth I (1558-1603), which inspired her to abandon the piano and take up the harpsichord at 16.

Then, in 1968, she taught herself to play the acoustic guitar after hearing Joan Baez sing “Geordie,” the seventeenth-century ballad.

That summer, she attended “Torah Corps” (the Olin-Sang Union Institute of the Union of American Hebrew Congregations). It was in this camp setting, in Oconomowoc, Wisconsin, that Ostfeld first experienced Torah study, informally and outdoors. The rabbis who led the sessions encouraged the teens to begin connecting the dots between the social activism of the late 1960s and Jewish wisdom.

Cantorial school 

In 1969, at age 17, Ostfeld called the registrar of Hebrew Union College – Jewish Institute of Religion (HUC-JIR) in New York to ask for an application to the School of Sacred Music. The registrar informed her that no woman had made such a request before, but ultimately sent her an application without any resistance. Sally Priesand, who became the first female rabbi ordained in the United States (the second in Jewish history), was already enrolled in the rabbinical studies program at HUC-JIR, the first woman to seek admission there. She was admitted in 1970, despite her ignorance of the Hebrew alphabet.

When she began in the cantorial program, then open to undergraduates, she was the only woman among twenty-two students, most of whom were in their twenties. During her first year, the New York Times interviewed her alongside a new female applicant. In the article, she discussed about her motives for applying to an all-male institution and denied entering the program to find a husband.

Most of the members of the faculty nurtured Ostfeld's academic progress. The school's vocal coaches had to adjust their ears to the register of a female voice singing the traditionally male cantorial repertoire. She was at first told to lip-sync during chorus rehearsals and performances so as not to adulterate the all-male choral sound. Ostfeld was ordained on June 6, 1975, at Temple Emanu-El in New York City.

She continued in her student pulpit at Temple Beth Shalom of Clifton, New Jersey, serving as cantor-educator in 1975 and 1976.

Career 

Ostfeld's first formal cantorial position was at Temple Beth-El of Great Neck, New York, where she served from 1976 to 1988. The other clergy, the leadership, and the members of this large congregation were generally supportive of her, and she had many wonderful colleagues and experiences. But Ostfeld also had to confront the challenges of being a “first” woman in a previously all-male career. She endured comments about her body, her wardrobe, her accessories, and her stiff handshake, which she'd developed deliberately—to ward off unwanted kisses in greeting lines.

From 1986 to 1988, while serving Temple Beth-El of Great Neck, Ostfeld was an adjunct faculty member of the HUC-JIR-SSM, instructing cantorial students in Reform repertoire. It was shortly thereafter that she was offered the position of director of the School of Sacred Music. She turned it down, however, citing a need to maintain a pulpit position.

In 1988, Ostfeld became the cantor of Temple B’rith Kodesh in Rochester, New York. Two years thereafter, she began serving as the cantor of Temple Beth Am (now Congregation Shir Shalom) in Buffalo, New York, where she served until 2002.

Cantorial work often includes the intensive preparation of boys and girls as they become b’nei mitzvah (“followers of the commandments”) Over the course of her career, Ostfeld tutored approximately 1,500 students. In addition, she taught courses, often focusing on feminist themes, for a number of years at Buffalo's High School for Jewish Studies under the auspices of the Board of Jewish Education.

She became the Director of Placement of the American Conference of Cantors in 2002. In that position, Ostfeld worked with congregations and cantors in making appropriate placements and developing suitable job descriptions. She advised cantors and senior cantorial students about resumes, audition recordings, applications and interview etiquette. During her 10 years as placement director, she worked with approximately 200 North American congregations, becoming widely recognized as a cantorial leader of the Reform Movement.
 
Ostfeld was also known for her work with youth choirs, specifically involving them in interfaith, Holocaust awareness, famine relief, and other tikkun olam (“repairing the world”) projects. Upon her retirement in 2012, Ostfeld became Placement Director emerita of the American Conference of Cantors. She continues to serve on its board of trustees and to participate in its Task Force on Women in the Cantorate.

Documentary appearance 

Ostfeld appeared in Cantor Michael Shochet's 1994 PBS documentary The Cantor: A Calling for Today, which details the training and the synagogue life of contemporary Reform cantors. The documentary features an interview with Ostfeld, along with her childhood cantor, Martin Rosen, who inspired her to become a cantor, and her former bar mitzvah student Steven Weiss who was just beginning cantorial studies himself. The documentary explores the “role of the Cantor in the American Reform Jewish synagogue, and how that role has evolved into a full clergy partner with rabbinic colleagues.”
The Cantor: A Calling For Today Weiss served as president of the American Conference of Cantors from 2016 to 2019.

Organizational affiliations 

Ostfeld has served several terms on the board of the American Conference of Cantors, an organization that cultivates excellence among cantors and strengthens Reform Jewish life in North America. She also served a term as chair of the Union for Reform Judaism's Joint Cantorial Placement Commission and as presenter at both regional and national conventions of the Union for Reform Judaism.

Awards and honors 

In March 2000, Ostfeld received an honorary doctor of music degree from Hebrew Union College-Jewish Institute of Religion. 
In December 2019, she received Reform Judaism's highest musical honor, the Debbie Friedman Award. Ostfeld accepted this award saying, “Worship will never again idle in bass clef!”

Personal life 

Ostfeld became a mental health advocate by making public her largely unseen struggles from childhood and throughout her adult life.

She was a fearful, anxious child, constantly worried about pleasing her demanding and irritable father. But she was comforted by singing in general, and particularly by singing solos in her synagogue and at school, which gave her a sense of self-worth because of the praise she received. But when classmates started to mock her singing in elementary school, she decided to cut half her volume and to sing with her mouth partially closed.

When Ostfeld was fifteen, her father's drug and alcohol use brought her family to a breaking point. An intervention became inevitable when airport security personnel at Chicago O’Hare called to report that her father's car was parked diagonally across two parking spots and left running while he flew to Washington, D.C. Ostfeld's mother, always in awe of her husband, was unable to act. Barbara took it upon herself to call two of her father's psychiatric colleagues who, together, urged him to commit himself to a psychiatric hospital. He blamed his subsequent professional downfall on her, and she began cutting herself in secret.

At age twenty-two, newly ordained and serving a congregation in New Jersey, she realized that she had not anticipated how much public attention would be given to her appearance. She was even being regularly asked about what she looked like under her pulpit robe. Unnerved, she began worrying excessively about her body and began a rigid diet. In five months Ostfeld lost forty pounds and stopped menstruating. Mistakenly believing that self-deprivation rendered her “good enough” to pursue her cantorial ambitions, she decided to interview for the cantorial position at a large, prominent synagogue in Great Neck, New York. By the time she became the cantor of Temple Beth-El of Great Neck, it was evident to those around her that she had an eating disorder.
 
Ostfeld realized that her health was at stake and sought psychiatric help for the first time. She found a psychiatrist and began a five-year course of psychoanalysis. The protocol fifty-minute sessions five times a week and free associating from a psychiatrist's couch. Through this process Ostfeld learned to understand her behavior and her choices, but she terminated her treatment without resolving her eating disorder.

When Ostfeld was in her early forties with two young children, her marriage came to a dramatic and public end and her mental health deteriorated again. She sought help from a local psychotherapist and was diagnosed with depression and anxiety. She began a course of anti-depressants and simultaneously a long course of weekly or biweekly psychotherapy. She learned how to interrupt negative thoughts and assess them before they affected her behavior. She successfully continued this course of psychotherapy until her therapist's retirement in 2015.

Not long after, following the deaths of her younger sister from breast cancer and her mother from Alzheimer's disease, Ostfeld's depression deepened and, for the third time, she consulted a therapist, this time engaging in cognitive behavioral therapy (CBT). 

In her mid-sixties, while Ostfeld was working on her memoir, a query from her editor prompted her to reveal that when she was a nineteen-year-old seminary student in New York City she had been raped by strangers on a Manhattan street. She had told no one at the time, and only a few people in subsequent years. The MeToo movement had begun by then, and Ostfeld felt strongly that although the book was nearing publication, it was necessary to tell this part of her story, which had secretly affected much of her writing and thinking. After making this decision, she found that she was finally able to talk about the long-suppressed sexual assault in a therapy session for the first time. Her therapist diagnosed her with post-traumatic stress disorder. 

Today, Ostfeld talks about her struggles with anxiety and depression. She advocates that mental health care is vital medical care.

Ostfeld is the mother of two adult daughters and lives in Buffalo, New York, with her husband, Todd.

Selected works

Memoir 

Ostfeld's memoir, Catbird: The Ballad of Barbi Prim, was published in 2019 (Erva Press), traces the trajectory of a young girl's perception of herself as she makes her way in a world of unwritten rules that become painfully clear. By revealing the personal struggles behind a pioneering public career, Ostfeld aimed to offer an intimate window into many of the all-too-common experiences of women and girls, and to normalize mental health care by showing the transformative role therapy can play in improving people's lives.

Other writings 

In addition to her memoir, Ostfeld is the author of “The Ascent of the Woman Cantor,” an essay appearing in Elyse Goldstein’s book New Jewish Feminism (Jewish Lights Publishing, 2012). Another of her essays, “Woman Cantors and Dollars in 1976,” appeared in the fall 2018 edition of The Reform Jewish Quarterly. Other essays have appeared in 10 Minutes of Torah, a daily email that brings the Reform Jewish world to subscribers worldwide, and in the Lilith Magazine blog.

Bibliography 
 Encyclopaedia Judaica Yearbook 1975/6, Keter Publishing House Jerusalem Ltd, 1976.
 Mark Slobin, Chosen Voices The Story of the American Cantorate, University of Illinois Press, 1989.
 Judah M. Cohen, The Making of a Reform Jewish Cantor, Indiana University Press, 2009.
 Bruce Ruben, “Barbara Ostfeld, Unassuming Pioneer,” Journal of American Synagogue Music 32, 2007.
 Michael Shochet, The Cantor: A Calling for Today, 1994, The Cantor: A Calling For Today

References 

1952 births
Living people
Hazzans
Women hazzans
20th-century American Jews
People from North Haven, Connecticut
21st-century American Jews